Agent Liberty (Benjamin Lockwood) is a fictional character appearing in American comic books published by DC Comics. Created by Dan Jurgens, he made his debut in Superman vol. 2 #60 (Oct. 1991), and was later given his own solo adventure in Agent Liberty Special # 1 (1992).

Sam Witwer portrayed a heavily adapted version of the character on the live-action Arrowverse television series Supergirl.

Fictional character biography
Benjamin Lockwood once worked for the CIA but ultimately left in disgust at their methods and the types of missions he was being asked to undertake. He became so disenchanted with the Federal Government as a whole that he joined the paramilitary group called the Sons of Liberty, who gave him the  equipment to become Agent Liberty. As Agent Liberty, Lockwood helped to forward the Sons' cause of overturning the governmental regime which brought him into conflict with Superman, though he later briefly assisted the Justice League in battling Brainiac in the crossover Panic in the Sky. However, when the Sons asked him to assassinate politician Pete Ross, Lockwood refused and helped to bring down the group by sending vital information to reporter Clark Kent (Superman's secret civilian identity).

Lockwood later learns that one of the founders of the Sons of Liberty was his former CIA mentor, and he became so disgusted with this revelation that he burned his Agent Liberty costume, vowing to never adopt the persona again. However, Lockwood subsequently becomes one of the many unwillingly brainwashed victims of a cult started by Brainiac and takes up the Agent Liberty identity once more. Agent Liberty and the other kidnapped meta-humans are rescued by Huntress and Vixen. Later, during the Earth-shaking crisis of Infinite Crisis, Agent Liberty is seen at a mass for fallen and missing superheroes.

Dozens of heroes, Agent Liberty included, also gather to defend the city of Metropolis from the Secret Society of Super-Villains. Liberty is seen heading for a heavily-armed cyborg being. Ultimately, the Society loses the battle.

Agent Liberty comes out of retirement to act as a member of the President's security detail while meeting with Superman and other Kryptonians newly arrived on Earth.

He was apparently killed when Superwoman uses her heat vision on him after she caught him spying on Sam Lane and Lex Luthor. His body was dumped in Metropolis Harbor where it was discovered and brought ashore by a group of boaters. Upon an autopsy it is discovered that Agent Liberty's suit had sent out a distress signal at the moment of his death, leaving clues to who killed him. Metropolis Metacrimes Inspector headed the investigation into Agent Liberty's murder. Before he could remove Liberty's armor, Lucy Lane had Lockwood's body removed from Metropolis City Hospital.

Powers and abilities
Agent Liberty is highly skilled in military tactics, hand-to-hand combat and marksmanship. His high-tech battle suit can generate a force-field of energy capable of deflecting bullets and houses weapons such as retractable gauntlet blades. He wears a jetpack that allows flight and was able to summon attack helicopters and other assistance from the Sons of Liberty.

Other characters named Agent Liberty
During the Codename: Patriot arc, a new female Agent Liberty has been seen as part of President Martin Suarez' security team. It is unknown at this time if she is connected to the Sons of Liberty, or even her predecessor Benjamin Lockwood, or if she is in fact yet another agent in General Lane's considerable list of operatives. The new Agent Liberty is apparently killed by Ursa when she attacks the White House during the War of the Supermen.

In other media

A heavily modified incarnation of Benjamin "Ben" Lockwood / Agent Liberty appears in Supergirl, portrayed by Sam Witwer. Introduced in the fourth season, this version is described as "ruthless and terrifying" as well as "a brilliant orator in the guise of a family man" who has "eerie abilities of persuasion and manipulation". Additionally, he was originally a mild-mannered college history professor who lost his home and father Peter (portrayed by Xander Berkeley) during the events of the second and third seasons respectively. Upon being fired by the university he worked at for his anti-alien opinions, Ben was approached by Lex Luthor's subordinates, Mercy and Otis Graves, who gave him the equipment needed to become a self-proclaimed "Agent of Liberty". Ben subsequently goes on to found the Children of Liberty to create a human-first world order and rid National City of alien life whilst keeping these activities a secret from his wife Lydia (portrayed by Sarah Smyth) and son George (portrayed by Graham Verchere).
 Additionally, an alternate timeline version of Ben appears in the fifth season episode "It's a Super Life".

References

External links
Agent Liberty at the Guide to the DC Universe

Fictional schoolteachers
1991 comics debuts
Characters created by Dan Jurgens
DC Comics male superheroes
DC Comics male supervillains
DC Comics television characters
Fictional Central Intelligence Agency personnel
Fictional marksmen and snipers
Fictional private military members
United States-themed superheroes